The Latin Alternative Music Conference (LAMC) is a major conference geared towards the marketing of Spanish-language alternative music.  It showcases what it considers the best in Latin music and the exciting fresh sounds coming out of rock, hip-hop and electronica scenes. This six-day event provides networking opportunities for leading artists, label executives, journalists, managers, marketers, retailers and programmers.

In past LAMC events, over 1,250 industry leaders converged at the Stewart Hotel in New York City to participate in industry panels, showcases, exhibitions, press conferences, and networking. Over 30,000 music lovers and industry insiders have attended LAMC concerts, parties and art exhibits, at venues throughout New York City.  Among the featured LAMC venues in New York are Central Park SummerStage, Celebrate Brooklyn at Prospect Park, Highline Ballroom, The Bowery Ballroom and Mercury Lounge. The conference was co-founded by artist manager Tomas Cookman and music executive Josh Norek in 2000 and continues to this day.

Attendees
LAMC brings together Anglo and Latino heavyweights from all sectors of the entertainment industry - from the participation of key English and Spanish-language magazines such as Billboard, Paste, Harp, Rolling Stone, Latina, Batanga and others, to the executives from leading U.S. and Latino labels, agencies, major corporations, television, print and new media companies. The conference ensures maximum exposure for Latin artists and repertoire in the U.S. marketplace. The attendance of international artists and label executives from Latin America and Europe makes LAMC a global event.

Panels
With the initiative of bringing Latin music to a wider, more mainstream audience, LAMC features several industry panels with known speakers from the entertainment and business world.  Among the topics addressed in the past have been Marketing to Urban Latino Culture, Approaches to Retail, Print Media/Television/Radio, Advertising & Sponsorship, International Markets, Music in Film, and others.  Each year, new and diverse panel topics are featured with speakers focusing on taking the industry to the next level. Past panelist include, Gabriel Abaroa, Carlos Vives, Pitbull, Thom Russo, Raul Campos, Johnny Marines, and many more industry and artist.

Concerts
LAMC features concerts by leading Latin alternative artists at top New York City venues like Prospect Park, Central Park SummerStage, Bowery Ballroom and Mercury Lounge. Past LAMC performers include Ozomatli, Orishas, Julieta Venegas, The Pinker Tones, Manu Chao, Plastilina Mosh, Los Amigos Invisibles, Calle 13, Natalia Lafourcade, Nortec Collective, Babasónicos, León Larregui, and Mexrrissey.

Artist Discovery Program
LAMC features an annual "discovery" contest, in search of bright new talent. Winners receive a chance to perform at an LAMC concert, inclusion on the LAMC compilation CD, a write-up on the LAMC website, and other prizes. Past winners include Kinky, Los Abandoned, Cuarto Poder, Pacha Massive, Carla Morrison and most recent 2016 winner ILE.

References

External links
LAMC Website
LAMC MySpace
Cookman International - Producer of LAMC

Alternative rock
Music festivals in New York City
Latin American music
Recurring events established in 2000
Music conferences